Janet (styled as janet.) is a video compilation released by American R&B/pop singer Janet Jackson.

Release information
Released on VHS on November 15, 1994, it was Jackson's first compilation of music videos produced under her then-label Virgin Records. The videos featured were produced for singles from her Janet. album, which had been released in May 1993, but omits "Whoops Now", "What'll I Do" and "Because of Love", three singles from the album for which videos were also produced.

The compilation features some videos which never appeared on any other home video release. "That's the Way Love Goes" was the only video from this compilation to be included in her greatest hits video compilation Design of a Decade 1986-1996.

Track listing

Extra features:
1. Behind-the-scenes footage.
2. Dance rehearsal sessions from "If".

Certifications

Release history

References

1994 compilation albums
1994 video albums
Janet Jackson video albums
Music video compilation albums
Virgin Records video albums